Alexander Nathan Etel (born 19 September 1994) is a former English actor most known for his lead roles in the 2004 film Millions and the 2007 film The Water Horse: Legend of the Deep.

Early life
Etel was born in a hospital on the outskirts of Manchester, the son of Nicholette Etel and Jason Hartley. Etel is the middle child of his family: he has a younger brother, Daniel Etel, and an older sister, Rebecca Etel. He attended Lum Head Primary School in Gatley in Stockport.

Career
Etel's film debut was the starring role of Damian Cunningham in Millions, a 2004 family film directed by Danny Boyle. He played the lead in his second film, Jay Russell's The Water Horse: Legend of the Deep.

Etel played Harry Gregson in the five-part TV adaptation of Elizabeth Gaskell's Cranford, which was transmitted in the autumn of 2007 and co-starred Philip Glenister, Judi Dench, Eileen Atkins, Francesca Annis and Imelda Staunton. He reprised his role in the two-part second series entitled Return to Cranford.

According to his official website, Etel's acting career is on hold while he attends university.

Filmography

Appearances

References

External links

1994 births
Male actors from Manchester
English male child actors
English male film actors
English male television actors
21st-century English male actors
Living people